Jalibah Southeast Air Base or Jalibah Air Base was a former military airport of the Iraqi Air Force. According to a report by the RAF, it had a main runway and two parallel taxiways as well as hardened air shelters in each corner of the Airbase

History

Operation Desert Storm - Air War phase 
During the early days of the war, the RAF identified Jalibah as a Main Operating Base for Iraqi MiG-23s and MiG-29s. On the morning 18 January 1991, eight RAF Tornados from Dhahran took off to attack Jalibah's Runways and HASs with JP233s, with USAF EF-111As and F-4G Wild Weasel aircraft providing SEAD support. Originally, these aircraft was supposed to attack a Scud missile site but the sortie was cancelled due to it being daylight. The No.4 Tornado had to turn back due to mechanical problems while remaining refuelled from a VC-10 tanker and approached to the target area.

A Muharraq-Bahrain based RAF Tornado strike occurred on the evening of 21 January. This strike was conducted at medium altitude with aircraft using each eight 1,000 pound bombs and was supported by four USAF F-4Gs and two F-15C Eagles. Several SAMs were launched although the RAF pilots concluded that the SAMs were most likely unguided. Several hours later, the first Dhahran RAF Tornado medium level strike occurred on Jalibah, each aircraft carrying five 1,000 pound bombs.

Ground War phase 
Towards the end of the war, the air base was the scene of the battle between the Iraqi Army and the US 2nd Brigade, 24th Infantry Division. On the 27th of February at 6:00AM, the US 2nd Brigade began the attack after an artillery barrage by supporting US Army forces. Among the Iraqi Losses were 20 aircraft (including an Su-25K Frogfoot-A) destroyed on the ground and a tank battalion. Jalibah Southeast Air Base was then captured by the US Army.

References 

Iraqi Air Force bases